Kennedy Okwe Eriba (born December 21, 1990 in Jos) is a Nigerian football player who currently plays for FK Jelgava in the Latvian Higher League.

Career
Eriba began his career with Mighty Jets F.C. where he played youth football for a few years before being scouted by Wikki Tourists F.C. in the Nigeria Premier League, with whom he signed his first professional contract. In August 2008 Kennedy had trials with Anderlecht of Belgian Pro League. Shortly after it was reported in the media that Eriba had signed for Anderlecht, however it was later that the Belgium giants and representatives of the player had  financial disagreements which led to the deal being canceled. In March 2012 the attacking midfielder signed with Veikkausliiga side TPS Turku and played his debut match for the club on 15 April 2012 against MYPA. He played five matches for TPS, before joining Åbo IFK on a one-month loan. During the short loan spell Eriba played his only match for Åbo IFK on 9 June 2012 against Ekenäs Idrottsförening. Kennedy returned to TPS and played 15 matches till November 2012. In his second Veikkausliiga season for TPS Eriba played thirteen games, leaving the club at the end of the season. In July 2014 Kennedy signed a one-year contract with the Latvian Higher League club FK Jelgava. He finished the season, having participated in 15 league matches and scored 2 goals as well as played at the UEFA Europa League qualification first-round against Rosenborg BK. Eriba helped FK Jelgava attain the bronze medals of the domestic championship and extended his contract for two more years in December 2014.

International career 
Eriba was a member of  the Nigerian under-20 squad that qualified for the African Youth Championship in Rwanda in 2009. He was also listed in the squad for the African Youth Championship itself but was ruled out of competition due to an ankle injury.

Honours

TPS Turku
 Finnish League Cup
 2012

References

External links
 
 

1990 births
Living people
Sportspeople from Jos
Nigerian footballers
Nigeria under-20 international footballers
Nigeria youth international footballers
Association football midfielders
Mighty Jets F.C. players
Wikki Tourists F.C. players
Turun Palloseura footballers
FK Jelgava players
Nigerian expatriate footballers
Expatriate footballers in Finland
Nigerian expatriate sportspeople in Finland
Expatriate footballers in Latvia
Nigerian expatriate sportspeople in Latvia
Expatriate footballers in Lithuania
Nigerian expatriate sportspeople in Lithuania
FC Stumbras players
A Lyga players
Åbo IFK players
Veikkausliiga players
Latvian Higher League players